The 1998–99 Oklahoma Sooners men's basketball team represented the University of Oklahoma in competitive college basketball during the 1998–99 NCAA Division I men's basketball season. The Oklahoma Sooners men's basketball team played its home games in the Lloyd Noble Center and was a member of the National Collegiate Athletic Association's Big 12 Conference.

The team posted a 22–11 overall record (11–6 Big 12). The Sooners received a bid to the 1999 NCAA tournament as No. 13 seed in the Midwest region, and made a surprise run to the Sweet Sixteen before losing to No. 1 seed Michigan State, 54–46.

Roster

Schedule and results

|-
!colspan=9 style=| Non-conference regular season

|-
!colspan=9 style=| Big 12 Regular Season

|-
!colspan=9 style=| Big 12 Tournament

|-
!colspan=9 style=| NCAA Tournament

Rankings

References

Oklahoma Sooners men's basketball seasons
Oklahoma
Oklahoma